His Day of Glory is a 1969 Italian drama film directed by Edoardo Bruno. It was entered into the 19th Berlin International Film Festival.

Cast
 Carlo Cecchi - Claude
 Maria Manuela Carrilho - Marguerite
 Raúl Martínez - Richard
 Sergio Serafini - Michele
 Alberto Hammermann - Paul
 Angelica Ippolito - Anita
 Luigi Antonio Guerra - Mario (as Luigi Guerra)
 Umberto Silva
 Philippe Leroy - The Commander
 Pierre Clémenti - Introduction

References

External links

1969 films
Italian drama films
1960s Italian-language films
1969 drama films
1960s Italian films